Antonio Gelabert Amengual (7 September 1921 in Santa Maria del Camí – 13 December 1956 in Palma de Mallorca) was a Spanish professional road bicycle racer. He became Spanish national champion in 1950 and 1955.

Major results

1949
Trofeo Jaumendreu
1950
 Spanish National Road Race Championship
Volta a Catalunya
Vuelta a España:
Winner stages 5 and 18
1952
Tour de France:
10th place overall classification
Clásica a los Puertos de Guadarrama
GP Pascuas
Vuelta a Castilla
1953
Vuelta a Asturias
1955
 Spanish National Road Race Championship
Vuelta a España:
Winner stage 3

External links 

Official Tour de France results for Antonio Gelabert

Spanish male cyclists
1921 births
1956 deaths
Spanish Tour de France stage winners
Sportspeople from Mallorca
Cyclists from the Balearic Islands